View of Paris from Vincent's Room in the Rue Lepic is the name of two painting by Dutch post-impressionist artist Vincent van Gogh in 1887 while he lived with his brother Theo in Paris.

1887 paintings
In 1887 van Gogh lived with his brother Theo in an apartment in Montmartre, which is located on Montmartre hill above the city of Paris. This afforded him a beautiful view of the Paris skyline, which he painted several times.  Two of the paintings were made in 1887.  The second painting View from Vincent's Window was made from a similar vantage point of View of Paris from Vincent's Room in the Rue Lepic.

1886 painting
An earlier painting was made of the view from his window titled Roofs of Paris or View of Roofs and Backs of Houses.  Van Gogh had become aware of Impressionism soon after arriving in Paris, but it took a while before he assimilated the knowledge into his work.  This early view of his window reflects the dark colors he had been accustomed to using, subdued browns and grays for the roofs and the backs of the houses. In it Van Gogh appears to focus primarily in the color graduations of the houses and rooflines.

References

1887 paintings
Paintings by Vincent van Gogh
Paintings of Paris by Vincent van Gogh
Collections of the Van Gogh Museum
Paintings of Montmartre